Bellwood may refer to:

People with the surname 
 Bessie Bellwood, a popular music hall performer of the Victorian era
 James Charles Bellwood, a New Zealand labourer, physical education instructor and sports coach
 Pamela Bellwood, an American actress
 Peter Bellwood, a Professor of Archaeology

Places in the United States 
Bellwood, Alabama
Bellwood, Florida
Bellwood (Atlanta), former name of the town, then from 1987 to 2007 neighborhood of Atlanta, now called Marietta Street Artery
Bellwood, Illinois
Bellwood (Metra), rail station
Bellwood, Louisiana
Bellwood, Nebraska
Bellwood, Pennsylvania
Bellwood Lake, Texas
Bellwood, Virginia
 Bellwood (Richmond, Virginia), listed on the National Register of Historic Places in Chesterfield County, Virginia
Bellwood, West Virginia
Bellwood, Wisconsin

Fictional places 
The protagonist's hometown (Ben Tennyson) on Cartoon Network's Ben 10 franchise.

See also
Belwood (disambiguation)
Beltwood House